Dharapani may refer to:

Dharapani, Bheri, Nepal
Dharapani, Gandaki, Nepal
Dharapani, Lumbini, Nepal
Dharampani, Rapti, Nepal
Dharapani, Sagarmatha, Nepal